Cerataphis is a genus of witch hazel and palm aphids in the family Aphididae. There are about 10 described species in Cerataphis.

Species
These 10 species belong to the genus Cerataphis:
 Cerataphis bambusifoliae Takahashi, 1925
 Cerataphis brasiliensis (Hempel, 1901)
 Cerataphis formosana Takahashi, 1924
 Cerataphis freycinetiae van der Goot, 1917
 Cerataphis jamuritsu
 Cerataphis lataniae (Boisduval, 1867)
 Cerataphis orchidearum (Westwood, 1879) (fringed orchid aphid)
 Cerataphis parsitica Qiao & Zhang, 2001
 Cerataphis pothophila Noordam, 1991
 Cerataphis vandermeermohri (Hille Ris Lambers, 1931)

References

Further reading

 
 

Hormaphidinae
Articles created by Qbugbot
Sternorrhyncha genera